Tommy Boy is a 1995 American buddy adventure comedy film directed by Peter Segal, written by Bonnie and Terry Turner, produced by Lorne Michaels, and starring former Saturday Night Live castmates and close friends Chris Farley and David Spade. This was the first of many films that Segal has filmed with former SNL castmates. It tells the story of a socially and emotionally immature man (Farley) who learns lessons about friendship and self-worth, following the sudden death of his industrialist father.

The film was shot primarily in Toronto and Los Angeles under the working title "Rocky Road". Tommy Boy grossed $32.7 million on a budget of $20 million making it a financial success. The film received mixed reviews from critics. Since its release, Tommy Boy has become a cult film and been also successful on home video.

Tommy Boy and the 1994 horror film Wes Craven's New Nightmare are dedicated to Gregg Fonseca (1952–1994), who died eight months before the release of Tommy Boy. While Fonseca did not work on either film, he served as production designer on the first two Nightmare on Elm Street films, as well as Coneheads and both Wayne's World films which, like Tommy Boy, were produced by Lorne Michaels.

Plot
After seven years at college, Thomas R. "Tommy" Callahan III barely graduates from Marquette University and returns to his hometown of Sandusky, Ohio. His father, industrialist and widower Thomas R. "Big Tom" Callahan Jr., gives him an executive job at the family's auto parts plant, Callahan Auto. In addition to the new job and office, Big Tom reveals that he plans to marry Beverly Barrish-Burns, a woman he had met at a fat farm, and that her son, Paul, will become Tommy's new stepbrother. However the day of the wedding, while at the party Big Tom dies from a sudden heart attack during the wedding reception. After the funeral, doubting the future of the company without Big Tom, the bank reneges on promises of a loan for a new brake pad division and seeks immediate payment of Callahan Auto's debts. Tommy suggests a deal: he will let the bank hold his few inherited shares and house in exchange for the bank giving time to sell enough brake pads to prove the new division's viability. If enough brake pads are sold by the deadline, the bank will grant the loan. Tommy then sets out on a cross-country sales trip with Big Tom's scornful assistant, Richard Hayden.

Meanwhile, Michelle notices Beverly and Paul kissing romantically. They are revealed to be not mother and son, but rather married con artists with criminal records. Instead of eventually suing for divorce and taking half of Big Tom's estate, Beverly has inherited controlling interest in the company. To turn that into cash, she seeks a quick sale to self-described "auto parts king" Ray Zalinsky. On the road, Tommy's social anxiety and hyperactivity alienate several potential buyers. The lack of any progress leads to tension between Tommy and Richard, percolating into a fistfight where Richard admitted he learned as much as he could from Big Tom, whereas Tommy covered his immaturity and blunders through Big Tom's protective cloak. When all hope seems lost, Tommy persuades a surly waitress to serve him after the kitchen has closed and Richard suggests he use his skill at reading people to make sales. The two make amends and quickly reach their sales goal. However, Paul sabotages the company's computers, causing sales posted by sales manager Michelle Brock to be either lost or rerouted. With half of the sales now canceled, the bank (now backed by Beverly and Paul) decides to sell Callahan Auto to Zalinsky. Hoping that they can persuade Zalinsky to reconsider, Tommy and Richard board a plane to Chicago posing as flight attendants. In Chicago, they get a brief meeting with Zalinsky, but he tells them he wants only the reputation connected with the Callahan brand and will close down the company and lay off its workers.

Tommy and Richard are denied entrance to the Zalinsky board room since Tommy has no standing. As they wallow on the curb in self-pity, Michelle quickly arrives with Paul and Beverly's police records. Tommy devises a plan: dressed as a suicide bomber by using road flares, he attracts the attention of a live television news crew and then, along with Michelle and Richard, forces his way back into the board room. Back in Sandusky, Callahan workers watch the drama on television. In a final move of pure persuasion, Tommy quotes Zalinsky's own advertising slogan, that he is on the side of the "American working man." As the television audience watches, Zalinsky signs Tommy's purchase order for 500,000 brake pads. Although Zalinsky says that the purchase order is meaningless as he will soon own Callahan Auto, Michelle shows the police records, which includes Paul's outstanding warrants for fraud. Since Beverly is still married to Paul, her marriage to Big Tom was bigamous and therefore never legal. Thus, all of Big Tom's controlling shares actually belong to Tommy, the rightful heir. Since Tommy does not want to sell the shares, the deal with Zalinsky is off, and since Tommy still holds Zalinsky's purchase order, the company is saved. Paul attempts to escape but is arrested. Zalinsky admits that Tommy outplayed him and invites Beverly to dinner. Back in Sandusky, Tommy gives a speech at the plant saying he will take his presidency of Callahan Auto seriously to keep the workers steadily employed.

Sailing on a lake, Tommy posthumously tells his father that he will continue his work and that he has started a relationship with Michelle. He says goodbye and wishes if Big Tom can hear him in the great beyond, he would appreciate some wind. The wind picks up immediately, causing the boom to swing at Tommy's head. Tommy then sails to shore to meet Michelle for dinner.

Cast 
 Chris Farley as Thomas "Tommy" Callahan III
 Clinton Turnbull as Young Tommy
 David Spade as Richard Hayden
 Ryder Britton as Young Richard
 Bo Derek as Beverly Burns-Barrish, Tommy's stepmother
 Julie Warner as Michelle Brock, a high school classmate of Tommy's who later becomes his love interest
 Dan Aykroyd as Ray Zalinsky
 Brian Dennehy as Thomas "Big Tom" Callahan Jr., Tommy's father
 Sean McCann as Frank Rittenhauer, the CEO of Callahan Auto
 Zach Grenier as Ted Reilly
 James Blendick as Ron Gilmore, the town banker
 Rob Lowe as Paul Barrish, Tommy's older stepbrother (uncredited)
 William Patterson Dunlop as R.T.
 David Hemblen as Archer
 Maria Vacratsis as Helen
 Colin Fox as Ted Nelson
 Jonathan Wilson as Marty
 Lorri Bagley as Woman in Pool

Reception

Box office
Tommy Boy opened on March 31, 1995, and grossed $8 million in its opening weekend, finishing first at the box office. The film had a total box office gross of $32.7 million.

Critical reception
Tommy Boy received mixed reviews from critics upon its release. Rotten Tomatoes gave the film a 42% approval rating, based on 43 reviews, with an average rating of 5.22/10. The website's critical consensus reads, "Though it benefits from the comic charms of its two leads, Tommy Boy too often feels like a familiar sketch stretched thin." On Metacritic, the film has a score of 46 out of 100, based on reviews from 20 critics, indicating "Mixed or average reviews". Audiences surveyed by CinemaScore gave the film a grade A− on scale of A to F.

Kevin Thomas of the Los Angeles Times gave the film a positive review, calling it "sweet natured" and a "good belly laugh of a movie". Brian Webster of the Online Film Critics Society also received the film positively, saying that the film would please Farley fans. Dan Marcucci and Nancy Serougi of the Broomfield Enterprise said the film was "Farley at his best", and Scott Weinberg of DVDTalk.com said that it was "pretty damn funny". In the 2015 film I Am Chris Farley, many of his fellow SNL peers praised Farley's performance; Dan Aykroyd stated that the movie showcased Farley's quality and range as an actor, while Jay Mohr noted that audiences were able to see Farley's sensitive and vulnerable side.

Among the negative reviews, Chicago Sun-Times film critic Roger Ebert only gave the film one star out of four, writing that: "Tommy Boy is one of those movies that plays like an explosion down at the screenplay factory. You can almost picture a bewildered office boy, his face smudged with soot, wandering through the ruins and rescuing pages at random. Too bad they didn't mail them to the insurance company instead of filming them." The film is on Ebert's "Most Hated" list. Caryn James of The New York Times wrote that the film was "the very poor cousin of a dopey Jim Carrey movie". Owen Gleiberman graded the film a "C" on an A+ to F scale, and Ken Hanke of Mountain Xpress said that it was a "Passably funny star vehicle. Nothing great."

Bo Derek was nominated for a Razzie Award for Worst Supporting Actress.

Soundtrack
Warner Bros. soundtrack release
 "I Love It Loud (Injected Mix)" – written by Gene Simmons & Vincent Cusano, performed by Phunk Junkeez
 "Graduation" – Chris Farley & David Spade
 "Silver Naked Ladies" – Paul Westerberg
 "Lalaluukee" – Chris Farley & David Spade
 "Call On Me" – Primal Scream
 "How Do I Look?" – Chris Farley & David Spade
 "Wait for the Blackout" – written by The Damned (Scabies/Sensible/Gray/Vanian/Billy Karloff), performed by The Goo Goo Dolls
 "Bong Resin" – David Spade
 "My Hallucination" – Tommy Shaw & Jack Blades
 "Air" – written by Pamela Laws & Nancy Hess, performed by Seven Day Diary
 "Fat Guy In Little Coat" – Chris Farley & David Spade
 "Superstar" – written by Leon Russell, Delaney Bramlett, & Bonnie Bramlett, performed by The Carpenters
 "Jerk Motel" – Chris Farley & David Spade
 "Is Chicago, Is Not Chicago" – Soul Coughing
 "My Pretty Little Pet" – Chris Farley
 "Come On Eileen" – Dexys Midnight Runners
 "It's the End of the World as We Know It (And I Feel Fine)" – R.E.M.
 "Eres Tú" – written by Juan Carlos Calderón, performed by Mocedades
 "Housekeeping" – Chris Farley & David Spade
 "My Lucky Day" – Smoking Popes

Other songs featured in the film
 "What'd I Say" – written by Ray Charles, performed by Chris Farley and Brian Dennehy
 "Maniac" – written by Michael Sembello and Dennis Matkosky
 "Ain't Too Proud to Beg" – written by Eddie Holland & Norman Whitfield, performed by Louis Price
 "Amazing Grace" – performed by The Pipes and Drums and Military of The King's Own Scottish Borderers
 "Crazy" – written by Willie Nelson, performed by Patsy Cline
 "I'm Sorry" – written by Ronnie Self & Dub Allbritten, performed by Brenda Lee
 "Ooh Wow" – written by Sidney Cooper, performed by Buckwheat Zydeco
 "The Future's So Bright, I Gotta Wear Shades" – written by Pat MacDonald, performed by Timbuk 3
 "The Merry-Go-Round Broke Down" – Cliff Friend & Dave Franklin

References

External links

 
 

1990s buddy comedy films
1990s comedy road movies
1990s screwball comedy films
1995 comedy films
1995 films
American buddy comedy films
American comedy road movies
American screwball comedy films
Films directed by Peter Segal
Films produced by Lorne Michaels
Films scored by David Newman
Films set in Chicago
Films set in Illinois
Films set in Minnesota
Films set in Ohio
Films set in Milwaukee
Films shot in Toronto
Films with screenplays by Bonnie and Terry Turner
Paramount Pictures films
Sandusky, Ohio
Films about father–son relationships
1990s English-language films
1990s American films